An oriented matroid is a mathematical structure that abstracts the properties of directed graphs, vector arrangements over ordered fields, and hyperplane arrangements over ordered fields. In comparison, an ordinary (i.e., non-oriented) matroid abstracts the dependence properties that are common both to graphs, which are not necessarily directed, and to arrangements of vectors over fields, which are not necessarily ordered.

All oriented matroids have an underlying matroid. Thus, results on ordinary matroids can be applied to oriented matroids. However, the converse is false; some matroids cannot become an oriented matroid by orienting an underlying structure (e.g., circuits or independent sets).
The distinction between matroids and oriented matroids is discussed further below.

Matroids are often useful in areas such as dimension theory and algorithms.
Because of an oriented matroid's inclusion of additional details about the oriented nature of a structure,
its usefulness extends further into several areas including geometry and optimization.

Background 

In order to abstract the concept of orientation on the edges of a graph to sets, one needs the ability to assign "direction" to the elements of a set. The way this achieved is with the following definition of signed sets.

In this way, a signed set is just adding negative signs to distinguished elements. This will make sense as a "direction" only when we consider orientations of larger structures. Then the sign of each element will encode its direction relative to this orientation.

Axiomatizations 

Like ordinary matroids, several equivalent systems of axioms exist. (Such structures that possess multiple equivalent axiomatizations are called cryptomorphic.)

Circuit axioms 
Let  be any set.

 (C0) 
 (C1) (symmetric) 
 (C2) (incomparable) 
 (C3)  (weak elimination)

Vector Axioms 
The vectors of an oriented matroid are the compositions of circuits. The vectors  of an oriented matroid satisfy the following axioms:

   
 
 for all , 
 ,
 , and
 .

Chirotope axioms 
Let  be as above.  For each non-negative integer  , a chirotope of rank  is a function  that satisfies the following axioms:

 (B0) (non-trivial):  is not identically zero
 (B2) (exchange): For any  such that  for each , then we also have .

The term chirotope is derived from the mathematical notion of chirality, which is a concept abstracted from chemistry, where it is used to distinguish molecules that have the same structure except for a reflection.

Equivalence 
Every chirotope of rank  gives rise to a set of bases of a matroid on  consisting of those -element subsets that  assigns a nonzero value. The chirotope can then sign the circuits of that matroid. If  is a circuit of the described matroid, then  where  is a basis. Then  can be signed with positive elements

and negative elements the complement. Thus a chirotope gives rise to the oriented bases of an oriented matroid. In this sense, (B0) is the nonempty axiom for bases and (B2) is the basis exchange property.

Examples 
Oriented matroids are often introduced (e.g., Bachem and Kern) as an abstraction for directed graphs or systems of linear inequalities. Below are the explicit constructions.

Directed graphs 

Given a digraph, we define a signed circuit from the standard circuit of the graph by the following method. The support of the signed circuit  is the standard set of edges in a minimal cycle. We go along the cycle in the clockwise or anticlockwise direction assigning those edges whose orientation agrees with the direction to the positive elements  and those edges whose orientation disagrees with the direction to the negative elements . If  is the set of all such , then  is the set of signed circuits of an oriented matroid on the set of edges of the directed graph.

These four sets form the set of signed circuits of an oriented matroid on the set .

Linear algebra 

To extend this construction to oriented matroids, for each circuit  there is a minimal linear dependence

Then the signed circuit  has positive elements  and negative elements . Oriented matroids that can be realized this way are called representable.

Given the same set of vectors , we can define the same oriented matroid with a chirotope . For any  let

where the right hand side of the equation is the sign of the determinant. Then  is the chirotope of the same oriented matroid on the set .

Hyperplane arrangements 
By picking one side of each hyperplane to be the positive side, we obtain an arrangement of half-spaces. A half-space arrangement breaks down the ambient space into a finite collection of cells, each defined by which side of each hyperplane it lands on. This collection of signed sets defines the set of covectors of the oriented matroid, which are the vectors of the dual oriented matroid.

Convex polytope 

Günter M. Ziegler introduces oriented matroids via convex polytopes.

Results

Orientability 
A standard matroid is called orientable if its circuits are the supports of signed circuits of some oriented matroid. It is known that all real representable matroids are orientable. It is also known that the class of orientable matroids is closed under taking minors, however the list of forbidden minors for orientable matroids is known to be infinite. In this sense, oriented matroids is a much stricter formalization than regular matroids.

Duality 

Much like matroids have unique dual, oriented matroids have unique orthogonal dual. What this means is the underlying matroids are dual and that the cocircuits are signed so that they are orthogonal to every circuit. Two signed sets are said to be orthogonal if the intersection of their supports is empty or if the restriction of their positive elements to the intersection and negative elements to the intersection form two nonidentical and non-opposite signed sets. The existence and uniqueness of the dual oriented matroid depends on the fact that every signed circuit is orthogonal to every signed cocircuit.  To see why orthogonality is necessary for uniqueness one needs only to look to the digraph example above. We know that for planar graphs, that the dual of the circuit matroid is the circuit matroid of the graph's planar dual. Thus there are as many different oriented matroids that are dual as there are ways to orient a graph and its dual.

To see the explicit construction of this unique orthogonal dual oriented matroid, consider an oriented matroid's chirotope . If  is defined as

then  is the chirotope of the unique orthogonal dual oriented matroid.

Topological representation 

Not all oriented matroids are representable—that is, not all have realizations as point configurations, or, equivalently, hyperplane arrangements. However, in some sense, all oriented matroids come close to having realizations are hyperplane arrangements. In particular, the Folkman–Lawrence topological representation theorem states that any oriented matroid has a realization as an arrangement of pseudospheres. In this sense a pseudosphere is just a tame sphere (as opposed to wild spheres). It is named after Jon Folkman and Jim Lawrence, who published it in 1978.

Geometry 

The theory of oriented matroids has influenced the development of combinatorial geometry, especially the theory of  convex polytopes, zonotopes, and of configurations of vectors (arrangements of hyperplanes). Many results—Carathéodory's theorem, Helly's theorem, Radon's theorem, the Hahn–Banach theorem, the Krein–Milman theorem, the lemma of Farkas—can be formulated using appropriate oriented matroids.

Optimization 

The development of an axiom system for oriented matroids was initiated by R. Tyrrell Rockafellar to describe the sign patterns of the matrices arising through the pivoting operations of Dantzig's simplex algorithm; Rockafellar was inspired by Albert W. Tucker's studies of such sign patterns in "Tucker tableaux".

The theory of oriented matroids has led to breakthroughs in combinatorial optimization. In linear programming, it was the language in which Robert G. Bland formulated his pivoting rule, by which the simplex algorithm avoids cycles. Similarly, it was used by Terlaky and Zhang to prove that their  criss-cross algorithms have finite termination for linear programming problems.  Similar results were made in convex quadratic programming by Todd and Terlaky. It has been applied to linear-fractional programming, quadratic-programming problems, and linear complementarity problems.

Outside of combinatorial optimization, OM theory also appears in convex minimization in Rockafellar's theory of "monotropic programming" and related notions of "fortified descent". Similarly, matroid theory has influenced the development of combinatorial algorithms, particularly the greedy algorithm. More generally, a greedoid is useful for studying the finite termination of algorithms.

References

Further reading

Books 
 
 
 
 
 Evar D. Nering and Albert W. Tucker, 1993, Linear Programs and Related Problems, Academic Press. (elementary)
  republished by Athena Scientific of Dimitri Bertsekas, 1998.

Articles 
 A. Bachem, A. Wanka, Separation theorems for oriented matroids, Discrete Math. 70 (1988) 303—310.
Robert G. Bland, New finite pivoting rules for the simplex method, Math. Oper. Res. 2 (1977) 103–107.
 
 
  
 
 R. Tyrrell Rockafellar.
 
 
 
 
 Michael J. Todd, Linear and quadratic programming in oriented matroids, J. Combin. Theory Ser. B 39 (1985) 105—133.

On the web

External links 
 Komei Fukuda (ETH Zentrum, Zurich) with publications including Oriented matroid programming (1982 Ph.D. thesis)
 Tamás Terlaky  (Lehigh University) with publications